Jolanda Neff (born 5 January 1993) is a Swiss cyclist, who primarily rides in the cross-country cycling and cyclo-cross disciplines, for the Trek Factory Racing team. She won the gold medal in the women's cross-country event at the 2020 Summer Olympics.

Career
She was the overall winner of the UCI Mountain Bike World Cup in 2014 and 2015. She was triple Under-23 Mountain Bike World Champion (2012, 2013 and 2014). At the 2017 UCI World Championships in Cairns she became the elite world champion.

In June 2015, she won the first gold medal for Switzerland in the women's cross country event at the European Games in Baku. Later the same month, she went on to win the Swiss National Road Race Championships.

Neff won the UCI Mountain Bike Marathon World Championships in 2016 and Mountain Bike XCO World Championship in 2017. She also won the European Mountain Bike Championships in August 2018 at Cathkin Braes, just outside of Glasgow.

In October 2018, Neff announced that she would join the new  team for 2019 in road racing, and Trek Factory Racing in mountain biking and cyclo-cross.

In July 2021, Neff won the gold medal in the women's cross-country event at the COVID-19 pandemic-delayed 2020 Summer Olympics. Her victory, along with her teammates Linda Indergand and Sina Frei winning the bronze and silver medals, marked the first all-Swiss Olympic podium since 1936 and the first time a nation has won all three medals in a cycling event since 1904.

Personal life
Since 2018, she has been in a relationship with American downhill mountain biking racer Luca Shaw.

Career achievements

Major results

Cyclo-cross

2017–2018
 EKZ CrossTour
1st Bern
1st Meilen
2nd Eschenbach
2018–2019
 1st  National Championships
 1st Grand Prix Sven Nys, DVV Trophy
 1st Meilen, EKZ CrossTour
2019–2020
 1st Trek Cup
 2nd Waterloo, UCI World Cup
2021–2022
 1st Trek Cup

Road
Source: 

2015
 1st  Road race, National Championships
 4th Giro dell'Emilia
 6th Trofeo Alfredo Binda
 9th Road race, UCI World Championships
2016
 1st  Overall Tour de Pologne kobiet
1st  Points classification
1st  Active rider classification
1st Stages 1 & 3
 3rd Trofeo Alfredo Binda
 8th Road race, Olympic Games
 10th La Flèche Wallonne
2018
 1st  Road race, National Championships
2020
 4th Time trial, National Championships
2021
 4th Overall Tour de Suisse Women
2022
 5th Overall Tour de Suisse Women

Mountain biking
Source: 

2012
 UCI World Championships
1st  Under-23 cross-country
2nd  Eliminator
 1st  Cross-country, UEC European Under-23 Championships
 National Championships
1st  Eliminator
1st  Under-23 cross-country
 2nd Basel–Muttenz, BMC Racing Cup
 3rd Overall UCI Under-23 Cross-country World Cup
2013
 UCI World Championships
1st  Under-23 cross-country
2nd  Eliminator
 1st  Eliminator, National Championships
 2nd  Team relay, UEC European Championships
 3rd Gränichen, BMC Racing Cup
2014
 UCI World Championships
1st  Under-23 cross-country
2nd  Team relay
 National Championships
1st  Cross-country
2nd Eliminator
 1st  Overall UCI Cross-country World Cup
1st Pietermaritzburg
1st Mont-Sainte-Anne
1st Méribel
3rd Albstadt
 BMC Racing Cup
1st Buchs
1st Lugano–Tesserete
1st Gränichen
1st Lenzerheide
1st Basel–Muttenz
 2nd  Cross-country, UEC European Under-23 Championships
2015
 UEC European Championships
1st  Cross-country
2nd  Marathon
 1st  Cross-country, European Games
 1st  Overall UCI Cross-country World Cup
1st Nové Město
1st Albstadt
1st Mont-Sainte-Anne
2nd Windham
2nd Trentino
 BMC Racing Cup
1st Schaan
1st Lugano–Tesserete
1st Solothurn
1st Gränichen
2016
 1st  Marathon, UCI World Championships
 UEC European Championships
1st  Cross-country
1st  Team relay
 1st  Cross-country, National Championships
 1st  Overall Swiss Epic (with Alessandra Keller)
2017
 UCI World Championships
1st  Cross-country
1st  Team relay
 1st  Cross-country, National Championships
2018
 1st  Team relay, UCI World Championships
 1st  Cross-country, UEC European Championships
 1st  Cross-country, National Championships
 1st  Overall UCI Cross-country World Cup
1st Albstadt
3rd Val di Sole
 Swiss Bike Cup
1st Gränichen
1st Andermatt
2nd Schaan
 1st Internacionales Chelva
 UCI Cross-country Short-track World Cup
2nd Albstadt
2nd Mont-Sainte-Anne
3rd Nové Město
3rd La Bresse
2019
 1st  Cross-country, UEC European Championships
 UCI Cross-country Short-track World Cup
1st Vallnord
1st Val di Sole
2nd Albstadt
2nd Lenzerheide
3rd Nové Město
 2nd  Cross-country, UCI World Championships
 2nd Overall UCI Cross-country World Cup
2nd Albstadt
2nd Vallnord
2nd Les Gets
2nd Val di Sole
2020
 1st  Cross-country, National Championships
 2nd Leukerbad, Swiss Bike Cup
 2nd Alpe d'Huez, French Cup
2021
 1st  Cross-country, Olympic Games
 1st  Cross-country, National Championships
 1st Andora, Internazionali d'Italia Series
 2nd Copa Catalana Internacional BTT
 UCI Cross-country Short-track World Cup
3rd Leogang
3rd Lenzerheide
2022
 1st  Short track, National Championships
 UCI Cross-country World Cup
1st Mont-Sainte-Anne
3rd Val di Sole
 UCI World Championships
2nd  Cross-country
3rd  Marathon
 3rd Overall UCI Cross-country Short-track World Cup
1st Nové Město
1st Mont-Sainte-Anne
3rd Lenzerheide

Awards and honours
She won the award for a seventh time in 2021, as all five Swiss female cyclists to ride, and win medals, at the 2020 Summer Olympics – Neff, Sina Frei, Linda Indergand, Marlen Reusser and Nikita Ducarroz – were recognised as joint winners.

Following her Olympic gold medal, a street in Thal was renamed as "Jolanda Neff Weg" in her honour in August 2021.

References

External links
 
 

1993 births
Living people
Swiss female cyclists
European Games gold medalists for Switzerland
European Games medalists in cycling
Cyclists at the 2015 European Games
Sportspeople from the canton of St. Gallen
Cyclists at the 2016 Summer Olympics
Olympic cyclists of Switzerland
Cross-country mountain bikers
Cyclists at the 2020 Summer Olympics
Medalists at the 2020 Summer Olympics
Olympic medalists in cycling
Olympic gold medalists for Switzerland
Cyclo-cross cyclists
21st-century Swiss women